Tup Qarah (also Romanized as Tūp Qarah) is a village in Garmeh-ye Jonubi Rural District, in the Central District of Meyaneh County, East Azerbaijan Province, Iran. At the 2006 census, its population was 134, in 25 families.

References 

Populated places in Meyaneh County